Bazaar is the second studio album by the American indie rock band Wampire. It was released on October 7, 2014, through Polyvinyl. It was produced by Unknown Mortal Orchestra member Jacob Portrait.

Track listing

References

2014 albums
Wampire albums
Polyvinyl Record Co. albums